Donald William King (March 11, 1929 – April 15, 2014) was a defensive tackle in the National Football League.

Football career
King played with the Cleveland Browns during the 1954 NFL season. After a season away from the NFL, he split the 1956 NFL season between the Philadelphia Eagles and the Green Bay Packers. Later, he played with the Denver Broncos of the American Football League.

He played at the collegiate level at the University of Kentucky.

See also
List of Philadelphia Eagles players
List of Green Bay Packers players

References

1929 births
2014 deaths
People from Chesterfield County, South Carolina
Cleveland Browns players
Green Bay Packers players
Denver Broncos (AFL) players
American football defensive tackles
Kentucky Wildcats football players
Players of American football from South Carolina
Philadelphia Eagles players